Ian Michael Redmond OBE FZS FLS (born 11 April 1954) is a tropical field biologist and conservationist. Renowned for his work with mountain gorillas and elephants, Redmond has been involved in more than 50 documentaries on the subject for, among others, the BBC, National Geographic and the Discovery Channel. Redmond was also involved in the 1988 film Gorillas in the Mist, spending some time with Sigourney Weaver so she could better understand her character.

As a junior researcher, he was involved in the filming of David Attenborough's famous encounter with a group of mountain gorillas in Dian Fossey's sanctuary in Rwanda. He recalled the event in BBC tribute programme marking Attenborough's 90th birthday.

Early life and family
Redmond was born in Malaysia, moving to Beverley, East Riding of Yorkshire, England aged five to live with his mother. It was in Beverley where his love of animals led to his becoming a member of the Beverley and Hull Naturalist Society. Redmond attended Keele University, studying Biology and Psychology.

Redmond is married with twin sons, Matthew and Benjamin. He has two brothers, Tom, a French horn player, and Timothy, a conductor.

He was appointed OBE in 2006. In 2011, Redmond was awarded an honorary degree from Oxford Brookes University for his conservation work.

References

External links 
 http://www.yorkshirepost.co.uk/features/39Who39d-have-thought-they39d-give.1588264.jp
 http://www.bornfree.org.uk/about-us/staff/campaigns-dept/

Living people
1954 births
Officers of the Order of the British Empire
20th-century British biologists
21st-century British biologists
Alumni of Keele University